The Oman national under-17 football team is the under 17 football team of Oman and is controlled by the Oman Football Association.

Their team got fourth place at the first FIFA U-17 World Cup they participated in at the 1995 FIFA U-17 World Championship, losing 2-0 in the 3rd place playoff to Argentina.

Competition Records

AFC U-16 Championship record

FIFA U-17 World Cup record

Oman FIFA Under-17 World Cup appearances

1995 FIFA U-17 World Championship
They played 6 matches in all, with the results shown below.

Group stage

Knockout stage
They played Nigeria in the Quarter-finals

They Played Ghana in the Semi-finals

They played Argentina in the third place match.

The Omanis got fourth place in the tournament.

1997 FIFA U-17 World Championship
They played 4 matches in all, with the results shown below.

Group stage

Knockout stage
They played Ghana in the Quarter-finals

2001 FIFA U-17 World Championship
The Omanis fared much worse, getting last place in their group and failing to reach the knockout stages.

Group stage

References

under-17
Asian national under-17 association football teams